Carex longicaulis is a tussock-forming species of perennial sedge in the family Cyperaceae. It is native to parts of Mexico.

The species was first formally described by the botanist Johann Otto Boeckeler in 1882 as a part of the work Flora. It has one synonym;
 Carex ciliaris as described by Merritt Lyndon Fernald.

See also
List of Carex species

References

longicaulis
Taxa named by Johann Otto Boeckeler
Plants described in 1882
Flora of Mexico